The Southern African Legal Information Institute (SAFLII) is the largest online free-access collection of legislation and case law from South Africa and other jurisdictions in the South African region.

SAFLII was formally created in 2002 as a joint project between the Australasian Legal Information Institute (AustLII) and the University of Witwatersrand (Wits) in Johannesburg, South Africa. In 2006 the South African Constitutional Court Trust assumed ownership of the project. The website at the time of this transition carried approximately 700 judgments from South Africa and Namibia.

SAFLII is currently in operation from within the Department of Public Law at the University of Cape Town and has been there from December 2013.

SAFLII became a member of the Free Access to Law Movement at the Law Via the Internet conference in 2003.

Currently, SAFLII serves over 220,000 unique visitors per month and provides access to about 49,000 judgements from South Africa alone. SAFLII also offers access to legislation and open-access journals such as De Jure, the Potchefstroom Electronic Law Journal, SADC Law Journal and Law, Democracy & Development.

References 
 Anderson K ‘The Southern African Legal Information Institute (SAFLII) - Achievements & Challenges’ [PPT] 8th Law via Internet Conference, Montreal, 2007
 Anderson K ‘Balancing Privacy Rights with Accessibility’ [PDF] 8th Law via Internet Conference, Montreal, 2007
 Badeva-Bright M ‘Challenges to Building a Legal Information Network in Africa’ [PPT] 8th Law via Internet Conference, Montreal, 2007
 Badeva-Bright M ‘Common Open Standards for Precedents’ Akomantoso Conference, Nigeria, 2007
 Badeva-Bright M 'Case Study: The South African Legal Information Institute' As part of the Free Access to Law – Is it Here to Stay? Project
 Jacobson P ‘Wealth of legal information available on the Web now, for free’ Jacobson Attorneys blog, December 2006
 Kabalu A 'SAFLII Report to the Southern Africa Judges Commission'. Retrieved 2 May 2012.
 Montgomery J ‘Free access to primary legal documents in Southern Africa’ 15(1) Organisation of SA Law Libraries (OSALL) Newsletter, Nov 2004. Retrieved 2 May 2012.
 Section on SAFLII in Greenleaf, G Legal Information Institutes and the Free Access to Law Movement, GlobaLex website, February 2008. Retrieved 2 May 2012.
 Gachago R ‘(http://www.africanlii.org/sites/default/files/Roger_Gachago_SAFLII.pdf The Southern African Legal Information Institute' [PPT] Access to African Supranational and Regional Law Workshop, Johannesburg 2012

Legal organisations based in South Africa
Free Access to Law Movement